Delaborde may refer to:
 Élie-Miriam Delaborde, concert pianist, (1839-1913), illegitimate son of Charles-Valentin Alkan
Henri François Delaborde, Napoleonic general (1764-1833)
Henri Delaborde (fencer), competitor in 1896 Olympics
Henri Delaborde (painter)
Jean-Baptiste Thillaie Delaborde,  (9 June 1730 – late January 1777), a French physical scientist, mathematician and Jesuit priest.